Paratylenchus elachistus is a plant pathogenic nematode infecting pineapples.

References

External links 
 Nemaplex, University of California - Paratylenchus

Tylenchida
Fruit diseases
Agricultural pest nematodes